Chris Porter (born May 29, 1984 in Thunder Bay, Ontario) is a Canadian-American former professional ice hockey left winger who played in the National Hockey League for the St. Louis Blues and the Minnesota Wild. He was drafted in the ninth round, 282nd overall, by the Chicago Blackhawks in the 2003 NHL Entry Draft.

Playing career
Prior to his professional career, Porter played collegiate hockey at the University of North Dakota. He spent four years at the University of North Dakota appearing in 175 games for the Fighting Sioux. He made his NHL debut with the Blues in the 2008–09 season opener. He scored his first career NHL goal on October 18, 2008 against the Chicago Blackhawks.

On July 16, 2012, Porter was re-signed as a free agent by the Blues to a one-year contract.

On August 8, 2015, Porter left the Blues organization as a free agent after 8 seasons and signed a one-year, two-way contract with the Philadelphia Flyers.  Porter failed to earn a spot on the Flyers during training camp and was placed on waivers by the team on September 30, 2015.  On October 1, 2015, prior to the 2015–16 season, he was claimed by the Minnesota Wild. Over the course of the campaign with the Wild, Porter consolidated his role on the fourth line, featuring in a career best 61 games for 4 goals and 7 points.

As a free agent, Porter was unable to attain a NHL contract over the summer. On September 12, 2016, Porter signed a professional try-out contract to attend training camp in a return to the St. Louis Blues. Unable to secure a contract in his return to the Blues, Porter was released and later signed on October 31, 2016, to a  professional tryout agreement with the Providence Bruins of the AHL.

Personal
Porter is close friends with University of North Dakota teammate and current NHL star of the Minnesota Wild, Zach Parise. He acted as best man at Parise's wedding as Parise did for him.

Career statistics

Regular season and playoffs

International

References

External links

1984 births
American men's ice hockey left wingers
Canadian ice hockey left wingers
Chicago Blackhawks draft picks
Chicago Wolves players
Ice hockey people from Ontario
Sportspeople from Thunder Bay
Lincoln Stars players
Living people
Minnesota Wild players
North Dakota Fighting Hawks men's ice hockey players
Peoria Rivermen (AHL) players
Providence Bruins players
St. Louis Blues players